Spencer Harry Gilbee Digby (26 June 1901–22 June 1995) was a New Zealand photographer. He was born in Dagenham, Essex, England on 26 June 1901.

References

1901 births
1995 deaths
New Zealand photographers
British emigrants to New Zealand
People from Dagenham